Corporal James Edwin Cross (March 27, 1840 - January 6, 1917) was an American soldier who fought in the American Civil War. Cross received the country's highest award for bravery during combat, the Medal of Honor, for his action at Blackburn's Ford in Virginia on 18 July 1861. He was honored with the award on 5 April 1898.

Biography
Cross was born in Darien, New York on 27 March 1840. He enlisted in the 12th New York Volunteer Infantry. He died on 6 January 1917 and his remains are interred at the Albany Rural Cemetery.

Medal of Honor citation

See also

List of American Civil War Medal of Honor recipients: A–F

References

1840 births
1917 deaths
People of New York (state) in the American Civil War
Union Army officers
United States Army Medal of Honor recipients
American Civil War recipients of the Medal of Honor
People from Darien, New York